Colin McComb (born May 1970) is an American writer and game designer, who is best known for his work designing the Planescape setting for the Dungeons & Dragons role-playing game, and as the creative lead for the role-playing video game Torment: Tides of Numenera.

Career history
Immediately after his commencement, McComb took at a job at TSR, Inc., where he produced numerous role-playing game supplements and magazine articles relating to those games. He won an Origins Award for Best Game Adventure in 1993 for Dragon Mountain, and another for New Role-Playing Supplement for the Birthright Campaign Setting in 1995. He is primarily known for his work on the Planescape line, for which he and Monte Cook were the primary designers after the departure of David "Zeb" Cook from TSR.

In 1996, McComb left TSR to take a job at Interplay Entertainment's roleplaying division, later called Black Isle Studios. While there, he had a small role in the design of Fallout 2 and a far more significant role in the design of Planescape: Torment. McComb left Black Isle in 2000, and moved to Detroit, Michigan with Robin Moulder, who would become his wife in 2001.

In addition to his gaming work, McComb contributed interviews, album reviews, and concert reviews to the underground magazine Outburn. In 2004, he reunited with his Planescape cohorts in the Malhavoc Press book, Beyond Countless Doorways, which received an Honorable Mention for Best Writing at the 2005 ENnie Awards. He and his wife also designed and wrote the manual for the MMORPG RYL in 2005.

McComb taught at the International Academy of Design and Technology.

On August 10, 2012, it was announced that McComb joined Wasteland 2 team as writer, reuniting with his Planescape cohorts once again.

McComb was the creative lead for inXile's 2017 RPG Torment: Tides of Numenera.

McComb works for the game studio Drop Bear Bytes as the Creative Lead on their upcoming title Broken Roads, an RPG set in a post-apocalyptic Australia.

Notable work

TSR
Advanced Dungeons & Dragons
The Complete Book of Elves
Dragon Mountain
Amazing Engine
The Galactos Barrier
Bughunter (additional design)
Birthright
Birthright Campaign Setting, with Richard Baker
Player's Secrets of Endier
Sword and Crown
Dark Sun
The Complete Gladiators' Handbook
Dragonlance
Taladas: The Minotaurs
Knight's Sword
Tales of the Lance
Dungeons & Dragons
Thunder Rift
Planescape
Planescape Campaign Setting (monster design)
Planes of Law
Planes of Conflict
Players Primer to the Outlands (Audio CD script)
Well of Worlds
Hellbound: The Blood War
On Hallowed Ground
Faces of Evil: The Fiends
The Great Modron March
Ravenloft
Islands of Terror
Howls in the Night
Ravenloft Monstrous Compendium III: Creatures of Darkness (additional design)
Masque of the Red Death and Other Tales

Black Isle Studios
Fallout 2
Planescape: Torment
Red Asphalt (in-game commercial scripting)

inXile Entertainment
Wasteland 2
Torment: Tides of Numenera

References

External links
 Colin McComb's official website
 MobyGames entry for Colin McComb
 
 
  — an interview in two parts with Chris Avellone and Colin McComb
  — an interview in two parts with Chris Avellone and Colin McComb

1970 births
Living people
American video game designers
Dungeons & Dragons game designers
Interplay Entertainment people
Lake Forest College alumni
Writers from Evanston, Illinois